César Chávez Park may refer to:
 César Chávez Park (Berkeley)
 Cesar Chavez Park (Sacramento), founded in 1849